Events in the year 1644 in India.

Events
The British establish themselves at Madras, building Fort George there.

Births

Deaths

References

 
India
Years of the 17th century in India